The Mississippian culture was a Native American civilization that flourished in what is now the Midwestern, Eastern, and Southeastern United States from approximately 800 CE to 1600 CE, varying regionally. It was known for building large, earthen platform mounds, and often other shaped mounds as well. It was composed of a series of urban settlements and satellite villages linked together by loose trading networks. The largest city was Cahokia, believed to be a major religious center located in what is present-day southern Illinois.

The Mississippian way of life began to develop in the Mississippi River Valley (for which it is named). Cultures in the tributary Tennessee River Valley may have also begun to develop Mississippian characteristics at this point. Almost all dated Mississippian sites predate 1539–1540 (when Hernando de Soto explored the area), with notable exceptions being Natchez communities. These maintained Mississippian cultural practices into the 18th century.

Cultural traits

A number of cultural traits are recognized as being characteristic of the Mississippians. Although not all Mississippian peoples practiced all of the following activities, they were distinct from their ancestors in the adoption of some or all of these traits.
The construction of large, truncated earthwork pyramid mounds, or platform mounds. Such mounds were usually square, rectangular, or occasionally circular. Structures (domestic houses, temples, burial buildings, or other) were usually constructed atop such mounds.
Maize-based agriculture. In most places, the development of Mississippian culture coincided with the adoption of comparatively large-scale, intensive maize agriculture, which supported larger populations and craft specialization.
Shell-tempered pottery. The adoption and use of riverine (or more rarely marine) shells as tempering agents in ceramics.
Widespread trade networks extending as far west as the Rocky Mountains, north to the Great Lakes, south to the Gulf of Mexico, and east to the Atlantic Ocean.
The development of the chiefdom or complex chiefdom level of social complexity.
The development of institutionalized social inequality.
A centralization of control of combined political and religious power in the hands of few or one.
The beginnings of a settlement hierarchy, in which one major center (with mounds) has clear influence or control over a number of lesser communities, which may or may not possess a smaller number of mounds.
The adoption of the paraphernalia of the Southeastern Ceremonial Complex (SECC), also called the Southern Cult. This is the belief system of the Mississippians as we know it. SECC items are found in Mississippian-culture sites from Wisconsin (see Aztalan State Park) to the Gulf Coast, and from Florida to Arkansas and Oklahoma. The SECC was frequently tied into ritual game-playing, as with chunkey.

The Mississippians had no writing system or stone architecture. They worked naturally occurring metal deposits, such as hammering and annealing copper for ritual objects such as Mississippian copper plates and other decorations, but did not smelt iron or practice bronze metallurgy.

Chronology
The Mississippian stage is usually divided into three or more chronological periods. Each period is an arbitrary historical distinction varying regionally. At a particular site, each period may be considered to begin earlier or later, depending on the speed of adoption or development of given Mississippian traits. The "Mississippian period" should not be confused with the "Mississippian culture". The Mississippian period is the chronological stage, while Mississippian culture refers to the cultural similarities that characterize this society.

The Early Mississippian period (c. 1000–1200 CE) had just transitioned from the Late Woodland period way of life (500–1000). Different groups abandoned tribal lifeways for increasing complexity, sedentism, centralization, and agriculture. Production of surplus corn and attractions of the regional chiefdoms led to rapid population concentrations in major centers.
The Middle Mississippian period (c. 1200–1400) is the apex of the Mississippian era. The expansion of the great metropolis and ceremonial complex at Cahokia (in present-day Illinois), the formation of other complex chiefdoms, and the spread and development of SECC art and symbolism are characteristic changes of this period. The Mississippian traits listed above came to be widespread throughout the region.
The Late Mississippian period (c. 1400–1540) is characterized by increasing warfare, political turmoil, and population movement. The population of Cahokia dispersed early in this period (1350–1400), perhaps migrating to other rising political centers. More defensive structures are often seen at sites, and sometimes a decline in mound-building and large-scale, public ceremonialism. Although some areas continued an essentially Middle Mississippian culture until the first significant contact with Europeans, the population of most areas had dispersed or were experiencing severe social stress by 1500. Along with the contemporaneous Ancestral Pueblo peoples, these cultural collapses coincide with the global climate change of the Little Ice Age. Scholars theorize drought and the reduction of maize agriculture, together with possible deforestation and overhunting by the concentrated populations, forced them to move away from major sites. This period ended with European contact in the 16th century.

Regional variations

Middle Mississippian

The term Middle Mississippian is also used to describe the core of the classic Mississippian culture area. This area covers the central Mississippi River Valley, the lower Ohio River Valley, and most of the Mid-South area, including western and central Kentucky, western Tennessee, and northern Alabama and Mississippi. Sites in this area often contain large ceremonial platform mounds, residential complexes and are often encircled by earthen ditches and ramparts or palisades.

Middle Mississippian cultures, especially the Cahokia polity located near East St. Louis, Illinois, were very influential on neighboring societies. High-status artifacts, including stone statuary and elite pottery associated with Cahokia, have been found far outside of the Middle Mississippian area. These items, especially the pottery, were also copied by local artists.

 Cahokia: The largest and most complex Mississippian site and the largest Pre-Columbian settlement north of Mexico, Cahokia is considered to have been the most influential of the Mississippian culture centers. Discoveries found at the massive site include evidence of copper working (Mound 34), astronomy (Cahokia Woodhenge and the symbolic maximum southern moon rise aligned Rattlesnake Causeway), and ritual retainer burials (Mound 72).
 Angel Mounds: A chiefdom in southern Indiana near Evansville. It is thought by some archaeologists that the Late Mississippian Caborn-Welborn culture developed from the Angel phase people around 1400 CE and lasted to around 1700 CE.
 Kincaid site: A major Mississippian mound center in southern Illinois across the Ohio River from Paducah, Kentucky.
 Moundville: Ranked with Cahokia as one of the two most important sites at the core of the Mississippian culture, located near Tuscaloosa, Alabama.
 The Parkin site: The type site for the "Parkin phase", an expression of Late Mississippian culture, believed by many archaeologists to be the province of Casqui visited by Hernando de Soto in 1542.

South Appalachian Mississippian

The term South Appalachian Province was originally used by W. H. Holmes in 1903 to describe a regional ceramic style in the southeast involving surface decorations applied with a carved wooden paddle. By the late 1960s, archaeological investigations had shown the similarity of the culture that produced the pottery and the midwestern Mississippian pattern defined in 1937 by the Midwestern Taxonomic System.

In 1967, James B. Griffin coined South Appalachian Mississippian to describe the evolving understanding of the peoples of the Southeast. South Appalachian Mississippian area sites are distributed across a contiguous area including Alabama, Georgia, northern Florida, South Carolina, central and western North Carolina, and Tennessee. Chronologically this area became influenced by Mississippian culture later than the Middle Mississippian area (about 1000 CE as compared to 800 CE) to its northwest. It is believed that the peoples of this area adopted Mississippian traits from their northwestern neighbors.

Typical settlements were located on riverine floodplains and included villages with defensive palisades enclosing platform mounds and residential areas. Etowah and Ocmulgee in Georgia are both prominent examples of major South Appalachian Mississippian settlements. Both include multiple large earthwork mounds serving a variety of functions.

Villages with single platform mounds were more typical of the river valley settlements throughout the mountainous area of southwest North and South Carolina, and southeastern Tennessee that were known as the historic Cherokee homelands. In Western North Carolina for example; some 50 such mound sites in the eleven westernmost counties have been identified since the late 20th century, following increased research in this area of the Cherokee homeland.

Caddoan Mississippian

The Caddoan Mississippian area, a regional variant of the Mississippian culture, covered a large territory, including what is now eastern Oklahoma, western Arkansas, northeastern Texas, and northwestern Louisiana. Archaeological evidence has led to a scholarly consensus that the cultural continuity is unbroken from prehistory to the present, and that the Caddo and related Caddo language speakers in prehistoric times and at first European contact are the direct ancestors of the modern Caddo Nation of Oklahoma.

The climate in this area was drier than areas in the eastern woodlands, hindering maize production, and the lower population on the plains to the west may have meant fewer neighboring competing chiefdoms to contend with. Major sites such as Spiro and the Battle Mound Site are in the Arkansas River and Red River Valleys, the largest and most fertile of the waterways in the Caddoan region, where maize agriculture would have been the most productive. The sites generally lacked wooden palisade fortifications often found in the major Middle Mississippian towns. Living on the western edge of the Mississippian world, the Caddoans may have faced fewer military threats from their neighbors. Their societies may also have had a somewhat lower level of social stratification.

The Caddoan people were speakers of one of the many Caddoan languages. These languages once had a broad geographic distribution, but many are now extinct. The modern languages in the Caddoan family include Caddo and Pawnee.

Hernando de Soto led an expedition into the area in the early 1540s, he encountered several native groups now thought to have been Caddoan. Composed of many tribes, the Caddo were organized into three confederacies, the Hasinai, Kadohadacho, and Natchitoches, which were all linked by their similar languages.

Plaquemine Mississippian

The Plaquemine culture was an archaeological culture in the lower Mississippi River Valley in western Mississippi and eastern Louisiana. Good examples of this culture are the Medora site (the type site for the culture and period) in West Baton Rouge Parish, Louisiana, and the Anna, Emerald Mound, Winterville and Holly Bluff sites located in Mississippi. Plaquemine culture was contemporaneous with the Middle Mississippian culture at the Cahokia site near St. Louis, Missouri. It is considered ancestral to the Natchez and Taensa Peoples.
Emerald Mound: A Plaquemine Mississippian period archaeological site located on the Natchez Trace Parkway near Stanton, Mississippi. The site dates from the period between 1200 and 1730. The platform mound is the second-largest Pre-Columbian earthwork in the country, after Monks Mound at Cahokia.
Grand Village of the Natchez: The main village of the Natchez people, with three mounds. The only mound site to be used and maintained into historic times.

Known Mississippian settlements

Although the Mississippian culture was heavily disrupted before a complete understanding of the political landscape was written down, many Mississippian political bodies were documented and others have been discovered by research.

Related modern nations
Mississippian peoples were almost certainly ancestral to the majority of the American Indian nations living in this region in the historic era. The historic and modern day American Indian nations believed to have descended from the overarching Mississippian culture include: the Alabama, Apalachee, Arikara, Caddo, Chickasaw, Catawba, Choctaw, Muscogee Creek, Guale, Hitchiti, Ho-Chunk, Houma, Iowa, Kansa, Missouria, Mobilian, Natchez, Omaha, Osage, Otoe, Pawnee, Ponca, Quapaw, Seminole, Tunica-Biloxi, Yamasee, and Yuchi.

Contact with Europeans

Scholars have studied the records of Hernando de Soto's expedition of 1539–1543 to learn of his contacts with Mississippians, as he traveled through their villages of the Southeast. He visited many villages, in some cases staying for a month or longer. The list of sites and peoples visited by the Hernando de Soto Expedition chronicles those villages. Some encounters were violent, while others were relatively peaceful. In some cases, de Soto seems to have been used as a tool or ally in long-standing native feuds. In one example, de Soto negotiated a truce between the Pacaha and the Casqui.

De Soto's later encounters left about half of the Spaniards and perhaps many hundreds of Native Americans dead. The chronicles of de Soto are among the first documents written about Mississippian peoples and are an invaluable source of information on their cultural practices. The chronicles of the Narváez expedition were written before the de Soto expedition; the Narváez expedition informed the Court of de Soto about the New World.

After the destruction and flight of the de Soto expedition, the Mississippian peoples continued their way of life with little direct European influence. Indirectly, however, European introductions dramatically changed these native societies. Because the natives lacked immunity to infectious diseases unknowingly carried by the Europeans, such as measles and smallpox, epidemics caused so many fatalities that they undermined the social order of many chiefdoms. Some groups adopted European horses and changed to nomadism. Political structures collapsed in many places.

At Joara, near Morganton, North Carolina, Native Americans of the Mississippian culture interacted with Spanish colonizers of the Juan Pardo expedition, who built a base there in 1567 called Fort San Juan. Expedition documentation and archaeological evidence of the fort and Native American culture both exist. The soldiers were at the fort about 18 months (1567–1568) before the natives killed them and destroyed the fort. (They killed soldiers stationed at five other forts as well; only one man of 120 survived.) Sixteenth-century Spanish artifacts have been recovered from the site, marking the first European colonization in the interior of what became the United States.

By the time more documentary accounts were being written, the Mississippian way of life had changed irrevocably. Some groups maintained an oral tradition link to their mound-building past, such as the late 19th-century Cherokee. Other Native American groups, having migrated many hundreds of miles and lost their elders to diseases, did not know their ancestors had built the mounds dotting the landscape. This contributed to the myth of the Mound Builders as a people distinct from Native Americans, which was rigorously debunked by Cyrus Thomas in 1894.

See also
 List of Mississippian sites
 List of burial mounds in the United States
 Ocmulgee Mounds National Historical Park
 Southeastern Ceremonial Complex

Notes

References
 Bense, Judith A. Archaeology of the Southeastern United States: Paleoindian to World War I. Academic Press, New York, 1994. .
 Cheryl Anne Cox; and David H. Dye, eds; Towns and Temples along the Mississippi. University of Alabama Press, 1990
 Hudson, Charles; The Southeastern Indians. University of Tennessee Press, Knoxville, 1976. .
 Keyes, Charles R. Prehistoric Man in Iowa. Palimpsest 8(6):185–229. (1927).
 O'Connor, Mallory McCane. Lost Cities of the Ancient Southeast. University Press of Florida, Florida A & M University, Gainesville, Fla., 1995. .
 Pauketat, Timothy R.; The Ascent of Chiefs: Cahokia and Mississippian Politics in Native North America. University of Alabama Press, 1994, .
 Pauketat, Timothy R.; "The Forgotten History of the Mississippians" in North American Archaeology. Blackwell Publishing Ltd., 2005.

External links

The Mississippian and Late Prehistoric Period, National Park Service Southeastern Archaeology Center, archived at Internet Archive
Mississippian World, Texas Beyond History
Cahokia Mounds
Etowah Indian Mounds State Historic Site
Indian Mounds of Mississippi, a National Park Service Discover Our Shared Heritage Travel Itinerary
Moundville Archaeological Park 
Chucalissa Museum and Archaeological site
Mississippian Period in Encyclopedia of Alabama
Animation: Towns and Temples of the Mississippian Culture-5 Sites

 
Mound builders (people)
Archaeological cultures of North America
History of indigenous peoples of North America
Native American history
Formative period in the Americas
Indigenous peoples of the Southeastern Woodlands
Great Lakes tribes
Mississippi River
Pre-Columbian civilizations
Post-Archaic period in North America
8th-century establishments in North America
16th-century disestablishments in North America
Pyramids in the United States